Besim is an Albanian masculine given name. It means "belief" or "faith" in Albanian. It is also used in Turkey and less commonly in Bosnia and Herzegovina. Besim may refer to:

People
Besim Ömer Akalın (1862–1941), Turkish physician
Besim Fagu (1925–1999), Albanian football player 
Besim Üstünel (1927–2015), Turkish economist and politician
Besim Bokshi (1930–2014), Albanian poet
Besim Sahatçiu (1935–2005), Albanian director
Besim Dina (born 1971), Albanian comedian and television presenter
Besim Kabashi (1976–2011), Albanian kickboxer
Besim Leka (born 1994), Albanian football player
Besim Šerbečić (born 1998), Bosnian footballer player

References

Albanian masculine given names
Turkish masculine given names